The Canton of Île de Ré is a canton on the Ré Island in the French department of Charente-Maritime, Nouvelle-Aquitaine, western France. It was created at the French canton reorganisation which came into effect in March 2015. Its seat is in Saint-Martin-de-Ré.

It consists of the following communes:

Ars-en-Ré
Le Bois-Plage-en-Ré
La Couarde-sur-Mer
La Flotte
Loix
Les Portes-en-Ré
Rivedoux-Plage
Saint-Clément-des-Baleines
Sainte-Marie-de-Ré
Saint-Martin-de-Ré

References

Cantons of Charente-Maritime